Arthur Bloch (born on January 1,  1948) is an American writer, author of the Murphy's Law books. He has also written a self-help satire called Healing Yourself with Wishful Thinking. Since 1986 he has been the producer and director of the Thinking Allowed PBS television series.

The proper title of the book is Murphy's Law, and Other Reasons Why Things Go Wrong!. The word wrong is printed upside-down on the book's cover.  This was the first of many Murphy's Law books.

References 

1948 births
Living people
American humorists